Rieker may refer to:
 Rieker Shoes
 Rieker (surname)